Ranipauwa is a town in central Nepal in the district of Mustang, formerly in the Kingdom of Mustang, about 12'140 ft. / 3'700 meters above sea level.

Ranipauwa with its numerous hotels, guesthouses, cafes, restaurants and souvenir-shops is a stop-over for both Hindu and buddhist pilgrims from all over the world on their way to the Temple of Muktinath as well as for trekkers on the popular Annapurna Circuit that runs around the Annapurna-Himal. When trekking clockwise, Ranipauwa is the last port of call before crossing the Thorong-La-pass (17'769 ft. / 5'416 meters above sealevel).

References

Populated places in Mustang District
Himalayas